Sheldon Lee may refer to:
Sheldon Lee (politician) (born 1933), Canadian politician
Sheldon Lee (footballer), English football forward
Sheldon Lee (Teenage Robot), a fictional character in My Life as a Teenage Robot

See also
Sheldon Lee Glashow (born 1932), American theoretical physicist